These are the results of the Boys' C1 Slalom at the 2010 Summer Youth Olympics. It took place at the Marina Reservoir. Time Trial Round was on August 24, 2010. First elimination round, repechage and third round took place on August 24, and quarterfinals, semifinals and medals rounds were on August 25.

Medalists

Time Trial

First round
The winners advanced to the 3rd round. Losers raced at the repechages.

Match 1

Match 2

Match 3

Match 4

Match 5

Match 6

Match 7

Repechage
The winners and fastest 2 losers advanced to the 3rd round.

Repechage 1

Repechage 2

Repechage 3

Third round
The winners and two fastest losers advanced to the quarterfinals.

Match 1

Match 2

Match 3

Match 4

Match 5

Match 6

Quarterfinals
The winners advanced to the semifinals.

Match 1

Match 2

Match 3

Match 4

Semifinals
The winners advanced to the finals, losers advanced to the bronze medal match.

Match 1

Match 2

Finals

Gold Medal Match

Bronze Medal Match

References
Time Trial
First Round
Repechage
Third Round
Quarterfinals
Semifinals
Finals

Canoeing at the 2010 Summer Youth Olympics